Bellis sylvestris subsp. pappulosa is a species of daisy in the genus Bellis and is a subspecies of Bellis sylvestris.

References

sylvestris subsp. pappulosa